Paraplacosauriops (near Placosauriops) is an extinct genus of anguid lizards from the middle Eocene of France.

Taxonomy
Paraplacosauriops was originally named Plestiodon quercyi by Filhol (1882) on the basis of dentary remains from fissure fill deposits in Quercy, France. Hoffstetter (1944) referred P. quercyi to the glyptosaurine genus Placosaurus, which is likewise endemic to Europe. However, Auge and Sullivan (2006) recognized quercyi as belonging to the tribe Melanosaurini and not a Placosaurus-like glyptosaurin, so they erected Paraplacosauriops for P. quercyi.

Description 
Distinguishing features of Paraplacosauriops include a distinguishing heterodont dentition, especially the anterior teeth being extremely slender, pointed and not peg-like.

References

Anguids
Eocene lepidosaurs
Eocene reptiles of Europe
Paleogene France
Fossils of France
Quercy Phosphorites Formation
Fossil taxa described in 2006